KSRA may refer to:

 KSRA (AM), a radio station (960 AM) licensed to Salmon, Idaho, United States
 KSRA-FM, a radio station (92.7 FM) licensed to Salmon, Idaho, United States